Situmbeko Musokotwane (born 25 May 1956) is Zambian politician and economist serving as the Minister of Finance of Zambia since 2021; he is also the Member of Parliament for Liuwa. Prior to his appointment he served as Minister of Finance from 2008 to 2011 under Rupiah Banda.

Education and career 
Musokotwane is PhD holder in Monetary Economics obtained from the Konstanz University in Germany. In 1988 he founded an agri-business one of Zambia’s largest dairy farming operations. He has also acted as an alternate Governor at the IMF, African Development Bank, and the World Bank. He introduced the central bank in Zambia to Open market operations and the re-introduction of Treasury Bills and Government securities auctions in Zambia. As Finance Minister during Rupiah Banda's presidency, he was active in the promotion of Zambia as an investment destination which brought a 7.6% growth in Zambia’s economy and generated US$6 billion over a 3 year term.

After being assigned as the Finance Minister under Rupiah Banda's presidency (2008-2011), he was assigned as the Finance Minister for the second time after the 2021 general election by President Hakainde Hichilema.

References

External links
 National Assembly of Zambia profile

Living people
1956 births
Finance Ministers of Zambia
Members of the National Assembly of Zambia
United Party for National Development politicians
Zambian economists
University of Konstanz alumni
University of Zambia alumni